LATV is an American bilingual broadcast television network owned by LATV Networks, LLC, that is aimed at Hispanic and Latino American adults between the ages of 18 and 34. The following article is a list of current and former affiliates of the network.

Affiliates

Current affiliates

Former affiliates

References

LATV